Narva Airfield is an airfield in Narva, Estonia, located in the town of Soldina just outside of the town of Narva. 

It is the easternmost airfield of Estonia. The airfield is covered by grass, and is mainly used for skydiving.

References

External links
 Narva Airfield at Forgotten Airfields

Defunct airports in Estonia
Buildings and structures in Ida-Viru County
Transport in Narva